Dunelm House is a Grade II listed university building in Durham, England, built in 1966 in the brutalist style. It belongs to Durham University and houses Durham Students' Union. Its listing entry cites, among other factors, that it is "a significant Brutalist building that reflects the latest in architectural thinking for its date" and that it is "the foremost students’ union building of the post-war era in England".

History

Construction 
The brutalist angular concrete building was designed by Richard Raines and Michael Powers of the Architects Co-Partnership, and completed in 1966 under the supervision of architect Sir Ove Arup, whose adjacent Kingsgate Bridge opened two years earlier.  Built into the steeply sloping bank of the River Wear, Dunelm House is notable internally for the fact that the main staircase linking all five levels of the building runs in an entirely straight line. This was intended by the building's architects to create the feeling of an interior street.

Music venue 
The building was opened in 1966 with a concert by the Thelonious Monk quartet.

During the 1960s and 70s, the venue was part of the national music circuit, and hosted bands including Pink Floyd and Procol Harum. After one gig in 1969, members of Free wrote the song All Right Now in their dressing room in the building, which went on to be their biggest hit.

Views 
In 1968 Dunelm House won a Civic Trust award. Sir Nikolaus Pevsner, the noted architecture historian, considered the building, "Brutalist by tradition but not brutal to the landscape ... the elements, though bold, [are] sensitively composed." Durham City Council's Local Plan notes that the "powerful" building, together with Kingsgate Bridge, "provides an exhilarating pedestrian route ... out into open space over the river gorge".

Public views were divided from the start, with a local newspaper in 1966 reporting views ranging from "the third best looking building in the city" (after the cathedral and castle), to a "monstrosity".  The Observer in 2017 reported that students called it "that ugly concrete building".

Uncertain future and eventual listing 
In 2016, the university applied for a Certificate of Immunity from Listing, and revealed plans to demolish the building as part of their estate masterplan, saying it would cost £15 million to make the building fit for purpose.

In 2017, the building hosted a conference under the title "Caring for Brutalism", sponsored by the university and the Twentieth Century Society, which brought together experts on brutalist architecture to discuss the significance and future of Dunelm House and similar 20th century buildings.

Historic England recommended Dunelm House for listing and the Secretary of State's initial decision to grant a certificate of immunity was appealed by the Twentieth Century Society. The initial appeal was unsuccessful but a second appeal on the grounds that there were irregularities in the listing process and evidence that the decision had been wrongly made led to an announcement in 2021 that the building would be listed at Grade II. This was reported in both local and national press.

References 

Buildings and structures of Durham University
Brutalist architecture in England
University and college buildings completed in 1966
Grade II listed educational buildings
Grade II listed buildings in County Durham